Timeline of the COVID-19 pandemic in Nigeria may refer to:

 Timeline of the COVID-19 pandemic in Nigeria (February–June 2020)
 Timeline of the COVID-19 pandemic in Nigeria (July–December 2020)
 Timeline of the COVID-19 pandemic in Nigeria (2021)
 Timeline of the COVID-19 pandemic in Nigeria (2022)

Nigeria